The Technology Administration (TA) was an agency in the United States Department of Commerce that worked with United States industries to promote economic competitiveness. The TA used the web domain technology.gov. The TA was most recently led by former Under Secretary of Commerce for Technology Robert Cresanti.

The TA oversaw three agencies:

 National Institute of Standards and Technology (NIST)
 National Technical Information Service (NTIS)
 Office of Technology Policy (OTP)

History
The Technology Administration was created by the Stevenson-Wydler Technology Innovation Act of 1980, 15 U.S.C. 3704.

The TA was abolished by the America COMPETES Act of 2007. NIST and NTIS continue on as agencies. It appears that the Office of Technology Policy was abolished.

See also
 Title 15 of the Code of Federal Regulations

References

United States Department of Commerce
Defunct agencies of the United States government
2007 disestablishments in the United States